Whitacre is an unincorporated community in northern Frederick County, Virginia, United States. Whitacre lies on the old Braddock Road on the eastern flanks of Timber Ridge between Good and Cross Junction. Whitacre is located north of Lake Holiday. The community takes its name from the Whitacre family that owned land in its vicinity.

Historic sites 
Redland Church

References

Unincorporated communities in Frederick County, Virginia
Unincorporated communities in Virginia